Mount Fleming is a mountain, over  high, standing at the southwest side of Airdevronsix Icefalls and Wright Upper Glacier, in Victoria Land, Antarctica. It was named in 1957 by the New Zealand Northern Survey Party of the Commonwealth Trans-Antarctic Expedition (1956–58) for Dr. C.A. Fleming, Senior Paleontologist of the New Zealand Geological Survey, and Chairman of the Royal Society's Antarctic Research Committee.

References 

Mountains of Victoria Land
McMurdo Dry Valleys